Michael Feinstein Sings the Burton Lane Songbook, Vol. 1 is a 1990 album by American vocalist Michael Feinstein, of songs composed by Burton Lane. A second volume, Michael Feinstein Sings the Burton Lane Songbook, Vol. 1 was released in 1992.

Feinstein was accompanied on piano by Lane, they duetted on the song "Applause, Applause". Two compositions by Lane had their debut recording here, "I Can Hardly Wait" and "And Suddenly It's Christmas".

Reception

The Allmusic review by William Ruhlmann awarded the album three stars and said of the album that "Since Lane never attracted the kind of anthologies devoted to the work of his peers, this album is especially valuable".

Track listing
 "Applause, Applause!" (Ira Gershwin) - 1:59
 "Dancing on a Dime" (Frank Loesser) - 3:56
Songs from Babes on Broadway:
"Babes on Broadway" (Ralph Freed) - 1:20
"Anything Can Happen in New York (and Play)" (E.Y. "Yip" Harburg) - 3:35
"How About You?" (Freed) - 3:11
"Babes on Broadway (Reprise)" (Freed) - 1:03
 "I Can Hardly Wait" (Alan Bergman, Marilyn Bergman) - 2:44
 "How Could You Believe Me When I Said I Love You" (Alan Jay Lerner) - 2:29
 "And Suddenly It's Christmas" (Ervin Drake) - 2:47
 "Too Late Now" (Lerner) - 3:25
 "You're All the World to Me" (Lerner) - 2:39
 "Moments Like This" (Loesser) - 3:22
 "How'dja Like to Love Me?" (Loesser) - 2:40
 "One More Walk Around the Garden" (Lerner) - 3:14
 "In Our United States" (Gershwin) - 3:29
Songs from Finian's Rainbow:
"How Are Things in Glocca Morra?" (Harburg) - 2:45
"Old Devil Moon" (Harburg) - 3:14
"When I'm Not Near the Girl I Love" (Harburg) - 3:04
"Look to the Rainbow" (Harburg) - 3:27
"If This Isn't Love" (Harburg) - 2:11

All songs composed by Burton Lane, lyricists indicated.

Personnel
Michael Feinstein - vocals, liner notes, producer
Burton Lane - piano, vocals, liner notes
John Costa - art direction, design
Alexander Isley - cover design
Robert Cubbage - engineer

References

Elektra Records albums
Michael Feinstein albums
1990 albums